Willem Wouter Gerritse (born 1 January 1983 in Amersfoort) is a Dutch ex-water polo player, who played for Hungarian top division side Egri VK and the Dutch national team. He ended his career as player at UZSC in Utrecht, where he made his debut as head coach for the men's first team in September 2014.

He is married with Sara Horvath since August 16, 2013. He met her while he was still playing water polo in Hungary.

His father, Wouter Gerritse, is also a water polo player, whereas his mother, Anke Rijnders, is an Olympic swimmer.

References

External links
 

1983 births
Living people
Dutch male water polo players
Dutch expatriates in Hungary
Sportspeople from Amersfoort
Dutch water polo coaches